Edyta Witkowska-Popecka (born 24 July 1979 in Przysucha) is a retired Polish wrestler and sumo wrestler.

Career
Witkowska won a bronze medal in the Sumo heavyweight event at the 2005 World Games in Duisburg and a silver medal in the Sumo-open weight event. At the 2009 World Games in Kaohsiung she won the bronze medal in the Sumo-open weight women's event.

References

External links
 
 

Competitors at the 2005 World Games
Competitors at the 2009 World Games
World Games silver medalists
World Games bronze medalists
Female sumo wrestlers
Polish wrestlers
Living people
1979 births
World Wrestling Championships medalists
People from Przysucha County